Bui Simon (born Porntip Nakhirunkanok; February 7, 1969) is a Thai-American personality, philanthropist and beauty queen who was crowned Miss Universe 1988. Simon is president and founder of the Angels Wings Foundation. She is on the Board of Regents of Pepperdine University, the Board of the Children's Museum of Indianapolis as a Distinguished Advisor and also is on the Board of Governors for the Dream Foundation.

Biography
Porntip Nakhirunkanok was born in Bangkok, Thailand. Her nickname is "Bui", which is her preferred name. It means "to sleep like a baby" in Thai. In the early 70's, she was brought to the United States by her family. She attended Washington Irving Middle School and Franklin High School in Los Angeles.  She had a younger sister who died in 2005. In August 1988, Nakhirunkanok was presented the Thai Royal Medal of Honour, Most Exalted Order of the White Elephant, by King Bhumibol Adulyadej for her service in helping children in need. She received a second Royal Decoration in 2001, Companion of the Most Noble Order of the Crown of Thailand.

In 1989, she was named United Nations Goodwill Ambassador of Thailand by Air Chief Marshal Siddhi Savetsila, Minister of Foreign Affairs of Thailand. As Goodwill Ambassador, she addressed the UN General Assembly concerning the Convention on the Rights of the Child. She graduated with a bachelor's degree psychology from Pepperdine University.

In 2002, she married Herbert Simon, an American businessman who is the owner of the Indiana Pacers basketball team and Simon Property Group.

Pageantry
In 1983, at the age of 15, Simon took part in the Miss California Teen USA where she was placed first runner-up. Upon her return to Thailand, she participated in the 1988 Miss Thailand pageant held in Bangkok where she won the right to represent Thailand at the Miss Universe pageant.

At age of 20, Simon was crowned as Miss Universe 1988 by outgoing titleholder Cecilia Bolocco on May 24, 1988, in Taipei, Taiwan. She became the second Thai woman to win the title after Apasra Hongsakula who won Miss Universe 1965. She entered the semi-finals in fourth place, right behind the United States, the Dominican Republic, and Korea. She received an interview score of 9.730, a swimsuit score of 9.684 and an evening-gown score of 9.752. Simon became the first woman ever to win both the Miss Universe and Best National Costume award in one pageant. At the time of Miss Universe 1988, Simon weighed 114 pounds, standing at 5'8". Simon crowned her successor, Angela Visser of the Netherlands, at Miss Universe 1989 in Cancun, Mexico.

References

External links
 Simon's Angels Wings Foundation

1969 births
Bui Simon
Living people
Bui Simon
Miss Universe 1988 contestants
Miss Universe winners
Bui Simon
People from Los Angeles
Toronto Metropolitan University alumni
Bui Simon
Bui Simon
Simon family (real estate)
Bui Simon